Yanjiang is the only district of the city of Ziyang, Sichuan Province, China. The district is located directly southeast of Chengdu. The district was established on June 14, 2000, by the State Council of China.

History 

Prior to annexation of by the Qin State, the area in the present-day Yanjiang District belonged to the Shu State, and was part of the wider, but now extinct, Ba-Shu culture.

Government

Administrative divisions
The Yanjiang District is divided into 4 subdistricts, 20 towns, and 2 townships. The district also hosts a labor camp, which is also included in population figures.

Subdistricts 
Yanjiang contains the following four subdistricts:
Lianhua Subdistrict
Sanxianci Subdistrict
Zixi Subdistrict


Towns 
Yanjiang contains the following twenty towns:










Wuhuang










Townships 
Yanjiang contains the following two townships:

Huilong Township

Sichuan Dayan Labor Camp 
Yanjiang District also is home to the Sichuan Dayan Labor Camp, which had a recorded population of 2,184 in 2010.

Economy 
The district recorded a GDP of 50.25 billion Chinese Yuan in 2018, an 8.1% increase from the previous year. The following table shows a breakdown of the district's GDP:

Agriculture 
As of 2018, the values of the district's agriculture, forestry, animal husbandry and fishing industries totaled 9.29 billion Yuan, a 3.6% increase from 2017. Of this, the district's seeding industry's output totaled 4.62 billion Yuan, the forestry industry's totaled 0.49 billion, animal husbandry totaled 3.32 billion, fisheries totaled 0.31 billion, and fishing-related services totaled 0.55 billion. The district government estimates that in 2018 alone, the district produced 85,000 tons of meat, farmed 72,000 hectares of land, and had a nursery area of 40 hectares.

Telecommunications 
At the end of 2018, the district reported 358,300 landline phones, 866,800 4G-capable mobile phones, and 450,500 broadband users.

Tourism 
In 2018, Yanjiang received 7.069 million domestic tourists, contributing 4.198 billion Yuan to the district's economy. The district also received 43,300 foreign tourists in 2018, mostly from Hong Kong, Macau, and Taiwan, contributing 945,600 US Dollars to the district's economy.

Demographics 
According to the 2010 Chinese Census, Yanjiang District had a population of 905,729 people, down from 1,016,034 recorded in the 2000 Census. The district government's website estimated that the population stood around 1,070,000 in 2019.

Settlements

Education 
At the end of 2018, the district reported hosting 424 schools, of which, 276 were kindergartens, 81 were primary schools, 63 were secondary schools, and 3 were vocational secondary schools.

Transportation

Road transport 
As of 2018, Yanjiang District has a road network totaling 3,970.5 kilometers in length, of which, 82.3 kilometers were expressways. In 2018, the district government recorded 54.52 million passenger trips on the district's roads, an 8.0% increase from 2017. The district was home to road freight totaling a weight of 61.28 million tons, which was also an 8.0% from 2017. Notable highways which pass through the district include the G76 Expressway, the S40 Suihong Expressway, the S106 Road, and China National Highway 321.

Maritime Transport 
The district reported 2.39 million tons of freight transported via waterways in 2018, a 14.9% increase from 2017. The main waterway in the district is the Tuo River.

References 

Districts of Sichuan
Ziyang